Raissa M. D'Souza is the Associate Dean of Research for the College of Engineering and a Professor of Computer Science and Mechanical Engineering at the University of California, Davis as well as an External Professor and member of the Science Board at the Santa Fe Institute. She was elected a Fellow of the American Physical Society in 2016 and Fellow of the Network Science Society in 2019. D'Souza works on theory and complex systems.

Early life and education 
When D'Souza was younger she faced the personal choice of going to college or moving to Paris to become a fashion designer. She eventually settled on university and studied physics at the University of Illinois at Urbana–Champaign. She earned her doctoral degree in theoretical physics at the Massachusetts Institute of Technology (MIT) in 1999, where she worked with Mehran Kardar and Norman Margolus. After graduation, she worked in both the fundamental mathematics group at Bell Labs and the Theory group at Microsoft Research. She held a visiting research position at the École Normale Supérior and the California Institute of Technology.

Research and career 
D'Souza was appointed as an Assistant Professor to the University of California, Davis in 2005, promoted to Associate Professor in 2008, and to Full Professor in 2013. She works on the mathematics of networks and the dynamics of how processes unfold on networks. These networks could be in technological, biological or social systems. She has studied the interaction between nodes, and how these can lead to self-organizing behaviour. She demonstrated that there exists a percolation threshold, where at a certain point a small number of additional connections can result in a considerable fraction of the network becoming connected. The percolation transition can be applied to a variety of real-world systems, from nanotubes to epileptic seizures or social networks. Large-scale connectivity and synchronisation can be crucial to the structure and function of complex networks. She demonstrated that sparse connections between separate networks helps to suppress cascading failures. She has also studied cascading behaviours in general, including power-grid failures, crashes in financial markets and spreads of political movements.

In 2014 D'Souza was awarded a United States Department of Defense Multidisciplinary University Research Initiative Award to investigate the prediction and control of interdependent networks for the period 2014–2019.

Academic service 
She is an External Professor at both the Santa Fe Institute and the Complexity Science Hub Vienna. She was a Kavli Fellow of the National Academy of Sciences several times and previously served on the World Economic Forum Global Agenda Council of Complex Systems. She was made an inaugural member of the Global Young Academy in 2010. In 2015, D'Souza was appointed the 2nd President of the Network Science Society, and served in this role until 2018.

In 2019, she was awarded the Network Science Society's inaugural Euler Award "for her influential contribution to the discovery and study of explosive percolation and the insights it provided to explosive synchronization and network optimization".

D'Souza serves on the Scientific Advisory Board of Quanta Magazine. She was made lead editor of the American Physical Society journal Physical Review Research in 2019. Since Aug 2020, she is a member of the Board of Reviewing Editors at Science.

Awards and honours 
Her awards and honours include;

 2015 Elected President of the Network Science Society
 2016 Elected Fellow of the American Physical Society
 2017 University of California, Davis Outstanding Mid-Career Faculty Research Award
 2018 ACM Test-of-Time award (for lasting influence of paper from 2008)
 2019 Network Science Society Euler Award
 2019 Elected Fellow of the Network Science Society
 2022 Outstanding Service Award of the Network Science Society

Publications 
Her publications include;

 
 
 
  Winner 2018 ACM Test-of-Time award.

References 

American women computer scientists
American computer scientists
University of California, Davis faculty
Fellows of the American Physical Society
Living people
1969 births
Network scientists
21st-century American women